Hubbardston is a village in the U.S. state of Michigan. It is mostly in North Plains Township in Ionia County, and partially in Lebanon Township in Clinton County. Its population was 395 at the 2010 census.

Geography

Demographics

2010 census
As of the 2010 census, Hubbardston had 395 people, 136 households, and 107 families. The racial makeup of the village was 97.2% White, 0.3% African American, 0.3% Asian, 1.5% from other races, and 0.8% from two or more races. Hispanic or Latino of any race were 4.3% of the population.

Of its 136 households, 33.1% had children under the age of 18; 55.9% were married couples living together; 14.7% had a female householder with no husband present; 8.1% had a male householder with no wife present; and 21.3% were non-families. 19.9% of households were people living alone; of these, 5.9% were 65 years of age or older. The average household size was 2.69 and the average family size was 2.87.

The village's median age was 41.8 years. 23% of residents were under the age of 18; 8.9% were 18–24; 24.1% were 25–44; 29.1% were 45–64; and 14.9% were 65 or older. 50.9% were male and 49.1% female.

2000 census
As of the census of 2000, there were 394 people, 130 households, and 99 families residing in the village. The racial makeup of the village was 98.22% White, 1.02% Native American, and 0.76% from two or more races. Hispanic or Latino of any race were 0.76% of the population.

There were 130 households, out of which 36.9% had children under the age of 18 living with them, 58.5% were married couples living together, 10.8% had a female householder with no husband present, and 23.8% were non-families. 13.8% of all households were made up of individuals, and 4.6% had someone living alone who was 65 years of age or older.  The average household size was 2.84 and the average family size was 3.15.

In the village, the population was spread out, with 26.6% under the age of 18, 7.4% from 18 to 24, 28.4% from 25 to 44, 24.6% from 45 to 64, and 12.9% who were 65 years of age or older.  The median age was 36 years. For every 100 females, there were 96.0 males.  For every 100 females age 18 and over, there were 97.9 males.

The median income for a household in the village was $36,458, and the median income for a family was $38,750. Males had a median income of $34,688 versus $21,500 for females. The per capita income for the village was $12,690.  About 8.8% of families and 11.5% of the population were below the poverty line, including 13.2% of those under age 18 and 5.8% of those age 65 or over.

References

External links
Hubbardston community website

 

Villages in Ionia County, Michigan
Villages in Clinton County, Michigan
Villages in Michigan
Lansing–East Lansing metropolitan area 
Grand Rapids metropolitan area